Vladimir Popov (born 1 January 1962) is a Russian former wrestler who competed in the 1988 Summer Olympics. Vladimir Popov took up wrestling in 1973 and made the Soviet national team in 1986.

References

External links
 

1962 births
Living people
Olympic wrestlers of the Soviet Union
Wrestlers at the 1988 Summer Olympics
Russian male sport wrestlers
Olympic bronze medalists for the Soviet Union
Olympic medalists in wrestling
World Wrestling Championships medalists
Medalists at the 1988 Summer Olympics